The Public Library of Libya is a public library in Libya, located in Benghazi. It had 14,000 volumes in 2002.

References

See also
 National Archives of Libya

Buildings and structures in Benghazi
Public libraries
Libraries in Libya